Roy Sherwood (11 June 1932 in Salisbury, Connecticut – 19 October 2017) is an American former ski jumper who competed in the 1956 Winter Olympics. After his career, he worked as a referee for ski jumping competitions. In 2008 he was inducted into the American Ski Jumping Hall of Fame.

References

1932 births
2017 deaths
American male ski jumpers
Olympic ski jumpers of the United States
People from Salisbury, Connecticut
Ski jumpers at the 1956 Winter Olympics